In the United States of America, the Tax Reform Act may refer to:

 Tax Reform Act of 1969
 Tax Reform Act of 1976
 Tax Reform Act of 1986

Taxation in the United States